Henry Edward Colley (21 February 1891 – 18 January 1972) was an Irish Fianna Fáil politician who served as a Teachta Dála (TD) for the Dublin North-East constituency from 1944 to 1957. He was also a Senator for the Labour Panel from 1957 to 1961.

He joined the Irish Volunteers in 1913, serving in the GPO garrison during the 1916 Easter Rising; British troops, believing him dead, used his body as a sandbag on their Gloucester Street barricade. He was imprisoned at Frongoch internment camp, and was released in December 1916; becoming second-in-command to Oscar Traynor in F Company, 2nd Battalion, Dublin Brigade IRA. Colley was prominent in the attack on The Custom House on 25 May 1921, was on active service right up to the truce, and was again seriously injured. He was opposed to the Anglo-Irish Treaty, he was active in the Irish Civil War at the Four Courts, Dublin, and was interned at Newbridge, County Kildare, where he went on hunger strike.

A founder member of Fianna Fáil, he was a leading member of its national executive and its organising committee. Colley was first elected to Dáil Éireann on his second attempt, at the 1944 general election, representing Dublin North-East. He remained a TD until he lost his seat at the 1957 general election, to the future Taoiseach Charles Haughey. Colley was elected to Seanad Éireann for the Labour Panel in 1957. He did not contest the 1961 Seanad election.

He married Christina Nugent on 14 October 1918, and they had five daughters and two sons. One of his sons, George Colley, was elected to the Dáil for the same constituency at the 1961 general election and went on to hold several cabinet positions, including those of Minister for Finance and Tánaiste. He was defeated in the 1979 Fianna Fáil leadership election, by the man who unseated his father, Charles Haughey. 

Harry Colley died on 18 January 1972 and was buried with full military honours in the republican plot at Glasnevin Cemetery.

See also
Families in the Oireachtas

References

1891 births
1972 deaths
Harry
Fianna Fáil TDs
Members of the 12th Dáil
Members of the 13th Dáil
Members of the 14th Dáil
Members of the 15th Dáil
Members of the 9th Seanad
Fianna Fáil senators
People educated at Synge Street CBS
Irish Republican Army (1919–1922) members
Irish Republican Army (1922–1969) members